Perennial crops are crops that – unlike annual crops – don't need to be replanted each year. After harvest, they automatically grow back. Many fruit and nut crops are naturally perennial, however there is also a growing movement to create perennial alternatives to annual crops. From the 1920s to the 1950s, researchers in the former Soviet Union attempted to perennialize annual wheats by crossing them with perennial relatives such as intermediate wheatgrass. Interest waned when the crosses repeatedly resulted in sterile offspring, and seed yield decreased significantly. The next major time the project of perennializing grain was picked up was a wheat hybrid developed by the Montana Agricultural Experiment Station in 1986, which the Rodale Institute field tested. For example, The Land Institute has bred a perennial wheat crop known as Kernza. By eliminating or greatly reducing the need for tillage, perennial cropping can reduce topsoil losses due to erosion, increase biological carbon sequestration, and greatly reduce waterway pollution through agricultural runoff due to less nitrogen input.

Benefits
Erosion control: Because plant materials (stems, crowns, etc.) can remain in place year-round, topsoil erosion due to wind and rainfall/irrigation is reduced
Water-use efficiency: Because these crops tend to be deeper and more fibrously-rooted than their annual counterparts, they are able to hold onto soil moisture more efficiently, while filtering pollutants (e.g. excess nitrogen) traveling to groundwater sources.
Nutrient cycling efficiency: Because perennials more efficiently take up nutrients as a result of their extensive root systems, reduced amounts of nutrients need to be supplemented, lowering production costs while reducing possible excess sources of fertilizer runoff.
Light interception efficiency: Earlier canopy development and longer green leaf duration increase the seasonal light interception efficiency of perennials, an important factor in plant productivity.
Carbon sequestration: Because perennial grasses use a greater fraction of carbon to produce root systems, more carbon is integrated into soil organic matter, contributing to increases in soil organic carbon stocks.
Perennial species have been shown to provide an opportunity for mitigating or reducing the negative effects of climate change while sustaining their agricultural productivity as well. It has also been shown that perennial plant communities may also enhance ecosystem resilience. As well as stability and ability to adapt to environmental fluctuations, due to them possessing high levels of biodiversity.

Examples

Existing crops
Fruit trees
Oil palm
Edible berries
Asparagus
Rhubarb
Chives
Mint
Oregano
Kale

Under development
Miscanthus giganteus - a perennial crop with high yields and high GHG mitigation potential.
Perennial sunflower - a perennial oil and seedcrop developed through backcrossing genes with wild sunflower.
Perennial grain - more extensive root systems allow for more efficient water and nutrient uptake, while reducing erosion due to rain and wind year-round.
Perennial rice - currently in the development stage using similar methods to those used in producing the perennialized sunflower, perennial rice promises to reduce deforestation through increases in production efficiency by keeping cleared land out of the fallow stage for long periods of time.

See also
Agroecology
Biodynamic agriculture
Guild (agriculture)
No-till agriculture
Permaculture
Perennial plant
Sustainable agriculture
List of culinary nuts
Fruit tree

References

External links
http://motherjones.com/environment/2008/10/qa-wes-jackson-Perennializing crops: Mother Jones Q&A with Wes Jackson
http://newfarm.rodaleinstitute.org/features/2005/0905/moonstone/hyk.shtml- Rodale Institute: Farm, food and family: In southwestern Minnesota, Audrey Arner and Richard Handeen are securing a future for their farm by "perennializing" the landscape.
http://www.perennialgrains.org/wiki/index.php?title=Rice_perennialization_program%2C_YAAS- Perennializing rice gene project

Crops